Papaikou is a census-designated place (CDP) in Hawaii County, Hawaii, United States, and is a few miles north of the county seat, Hilo. The population of Papaikou was 1,314 at the 2010 census, down from 1,414 at the 2000 census.

Geography
Papaikou is located on the east side of the island of Hawaii at  (19.794022, -155.096531). Hawaii Route 19 passes through the community, leading south  to Hilo and northwest  to Honokaa.

The CDP borders the Pacific Ocean from Hokeo Point in the north to Kekiwi Point in the south.

Climate
Papaikou has a tropical rainforest climate (Af) with heavy rainfall year-round.

Demographics

At the 2000 census there were 1,414 people, 475 households, and 363 families in the CDP. The racial makeup of the CDP was 15.28% White, 0.50% African American, 0.07% Native American, 45.83% Asian, 9.41% Pacific Islander, 1.41% from other races, and 27.51% from two or more races. Hispanic or Latino of any race were 6.86%.

Of the 475 households 29.5% had children under the age of 18 living with them, 52.8% were married couples living together, 14.7% had a female householder with no husband present, and 23.4% were non-families. 19.4% of households were one person and 10.7% were one person aged 65 or older.  The average household size was 2.98 and the average family size was 3.35.

The age distribution was 24.2% under the age of 18, 7.8% from 18 to 24, 24.8% from 25 to 44, 23.2% from 45 to 64, and 20.1% 65 or older.  The median age was 40 years. For every 100 females, there were 97.2 males.  For every 100 females age 18 and over, there were 96.3 males.

The median household income was $37,031 and the median family income  was $40,446. Males had a median income of $25,000 versus $24,205 for females. The per capita income for the CDP was $13,782.  About 12.1% of families and 15.0% of the population were below the poverty line, including 18.0% of those under age 18 and 7.6% of those age 65 or over.

Points of interest
 Hawaii Tropical Botanical Garden

See also

 List of census-designated places in Hawaii

References

External links

Census-designated places in Hawaii County, Hawaii
Populated places on Hawaii (island)
Populated coastal places in Hawaii